Edwin William Stephens or E. W. Stephens (1849–1931) was an American publisher, journalist, and prominent leader in civic and religious affairs from Columbia, Missouri. He founded E.W. Stephens Publishing Company and published a daily newspaper known as the Columbia Herald. A prominent Baptist, he was president of the Southern Baptist Convention. In 1911 he chaired the committee that designed and built the Missouri State Capitol. He served president of the board of curators of both the University of Missouri and Stephens College, the latter being named after his father James Stephens.

Biography
Edwin William Stephens was born in into a prominent family in Columbia, Missouri on January 21, 1849. He graduated from the University of Missouri in 1867. He was hired by William Switzler, publisher of the Missouri Statesman. In 1870 he went into business for himself, eventually founding the Columbia Herald, which became famous as "America's model weekly." He also founded the E.W. Stephens Publishing Company.  Stephens served as president of the board of curators for both the University of Missouri and Stephens College, which was named after his father James L. Stephens. In 1890 he was president of the Missouri Press Association where he would advocate for the creation of the Missouri State Historical Society and became its first president in 1898. His relationship with Walter Williams, who he employed at the Herald, would lead to the creation of the world's first school of journalism: the Missouri School of Journalism. Stephens chaired the commission responsible for the design and construction of the current Missouri State Capitol.

He was a lifelong member and leader of First Baptist Church in Columbia. He died at his home on May 21, 1931, and is buried in the Columbia Cemetery.

See also
Boone County Historical Society
List of Southern Baptist Convention affiliated people
Southern Baptist Convention
Southern Baptist Convention Presidents

References

1849 births
1931 deaths
Stephens College people
Journalists from Missouri
American publishers (people)
University of Missouri alumni
University of Missouri curators
Writers from Columbia, Missouri
Burials at Columbia Cemetery (Columbia, Missouri)
Southern Baptist Convention presidents